These page shows the results of the 2004 European Beach Volleyball Championships, held from June 9 to June 13, 2004 in Timmendorfer Strand, Germany. It was the twelfth official edition of the men's event, which started in 1993, while the women competed for the eleventh time.

Men's competition
 A total number of 39 participating couples

Women's competition
 A total number of 46 participating couples

References
 Beach Volleyball Results

2004
E
B
B